Acantholipes juba is a species of moth in the family Erebidae. It is found in Australia, where it has been recorded from Queensland and the Northern Territory.

The wingspan is about 20 mm. The wings are blotchy brown, with a pale-edged submarginal line on the forewings.

References

juba
Moths described in 1902
Moths of Australia